Piptoporus australiensis, commonly known as curry punk, is a polyporous bracket fungi. It is found in Australia. Often found on dead eucalypt trees and logs, often favouring fire-damaged wood. Curry Punk is named for its persistent curry smell which develops with age. The white top of this large, thick bracket becomes stained pale cream to orange by the orange flesh. Deep orange-yellow pores exude copious amounts of saffron-yellow juice.

Description
The Field Guide to Australian Fungi by Bruce A. Fuhrer describes it in this way: "Piptoporus australiensis is usually called Curry Punk because of its persistent curry-like odour, even when old and dry. In contrast to other spongy polypores, this species appears to be immune to insect attack. The large brackets occur on logs, particularly those that have been charred by fire, causing a brown cubical rot."

Cap diameter to 200 mm, projects to 170 mm; thickness to 80 mm; irregular to semicircular, flat to convex; white then staining yellow, orange to brown; soft but tough, smooth, ridged or pitted, greasy when wet; margin smooth, incurved. Pores are 1–10 per mm; round, angular or irregular; saffron-yellow, ageing to orange, rusty-brown; weeps saffron-yellow juice when wet. No stem, laterally attached to substrate by a broad base. Strong persistent curry smell when old or dry.

References

Fomitopsidaceae
Fungi of Australia